Ivan Stanković (born 27 April 1982) is a Serbian former handball player.

Club career
Over the course of his career that spanned almost two decades, Stanković played for Partizan (1999–2004), Bidasoa (2004–2007), Aragón (2007–2011), US Créteil (2011–2014) and US Ivry (2014–2017). He won two championship titles with Partizan.

International career
At international level, Stanković represented Serbia in five major tournaments. He was a member of the team that won the silver medal at the 2012 European Championship. Later that year, Stanković took part in the 2012 Summer Olympics.

Honours
Partizan
 Serbia and Montenegro Handball Super League: 2001–02, 2002–03
 Serbia and Montenegro Handball Cup: 2000–01

References

External links

 LNH record
 Olympic record
 
 

1982 births
Living people
Handball players from Belgrade
Serbian male handball players
Olympic handball players of Serbia
Handball players at the 2012 Summer Olympics
RK Partizan players
BM Aragón players
Liga ASOBAL players
Expatriate handball players
Serbian expatriate sportspeople in Spain
Serbian expatriate sportspeople in France